Navratra Akhand Jyoti (Uninterrupted flame, Akhand Jyoti, Jyot, Jyoti, Mata ki Jyoti)  is an oil lamp that burns continuously for 9–10 days on the festival of Navaratri in the honor of the divine  Devi (Durga). A Jyoti is an essential part of puja, especially at arti (Hinduism).

Jyoti 

Jyoti is a holy flame that is lit with cotton wicks and ghee or mustard oil. It is the prayer ritual of devotional worship performed by Hindus offer to the deities. Jyoti is also a representation of the divine light and a form of the Hindu goddess Durga shakti.

Akhand jyoti 
 (Akhand jyoti) means a flame that burns without any interruption. The jyot burns all the time following certain rituals. For instance it is said in the vedas that

Diya with ghee should be kept on the right hand side of Goddess and an oil lit diya should be kept Diya with ghee should be kept on the left side.

Others

There is a Durga temple in Bihar where the jyot has been burning continuously for more than 100 years.

There is tradition of bringing jyot from Jwala ji temple for Mata Durga's Jagran.

See also 

 Puja (Hinduism)
 Arti (Hinduism)
 Navaratri
 Jagran
Agni

References 

Oil lamp
Objects used in Hindu worship
Puja (Hinduism)
Aarti